YCA may refer to:

 The International Air Transport Association airport code of Courtenay Airpark
 Yemen Cyber Army, hacker group